Sarangarh was a princely state in India during the British Raj ruled by a Raj Gond dynasty. The emblem of the state was a turtle.

Its capital was in Sarangarh town, now in Chhattisgarh state. 
The state had no significant towns except for its capital. Its area was 1,399 square km with a population of 79,900 persons according to the 1901 census.

History
According to legend Sarangarh state was founded in the first century AD by Gond ancestors that had migrated from Bhandara. It was originally a dependency of the Ratanpur Kingdom and later became one of the eighteen Garhjat states under Sambalpur State The Sambalpur kings favoured Sarangarh owing to its readiness to help their kingdom during military campaigns.

In 1818 Sarangarh became a British protectorate. Between 1878 and 1889 Sarangarh state was placed under the direct administration of British India owing to economic mismanagement and the infancy of the ruler Bhawani Pratap Singh. Sarangarh was a small feudatory state, part of the Chhattisgarh division.

On 1 January 1948 Sarangarh State acceded to the Indian Union.

Rulers
Sarangarh State was one of several princely states governed by the Raj Gond Dynasty of Gonds. The rulers bore the title 'Raja'

Rajas
.... – ....                Udibhan Singh 
.... – ....                Birbhan Singh 
.... – 1736                Udho Sai Singh 
1736 – 1777                Kalyan Sai 
1777 – 1808                Vishvanath Sai 
1808 – 1815                Subhadra Sai 
1827 –  5 January 1828         Bhikhan Sai                        (d. 1828) 
 5 January 1828 – 1828         Tikan Sai 
1828 – May 1829            Gajraj Singh                       (d. 1829)
May 1829 – 1872            Singram Singh 
1872 – Sep 1889            Bhawani Pratap Singh               (b. c.1865 – d. 1889) 
Sep 1889 –  5 August 1890     Lal Raghubir Singh                 (d. 1890) 
 5 August 1890 – 11 January 1946  Bahadur Jawahir Singh              (b. 1886 – d. 1946) 
11 Jan 1946 – 15 August 1947  Naresh Chandra Singh               (b. 1908 – d. 1987)
(1988- d. 2016) Raja Sishir Raj Bindu Singh
 (2016 - present) Raja Shree Raj Singh

See also
Eastern States Agency
Political integration of India

References

Princely states of India
History of Chhattisgarh
Raigarh district